Cymbidium hartinahianum is an orchid endemic to North Sumatra, Indonesia. It was first found in 1976 by Rusdy E. Nasution, a researcher from Herbarium LBN/LIPI Bogor, at Desa Baniara Tele, Kecamatan Harian, Kabupaten Samosir, North Sumatra. This orchid is classified as 'extinct in the wild' and cannot be sold freely except as a human-propagated specimen. The flower can be found at Kebun Raya Bogor.

The orchid is named for Siti Hartinah Suharto, the wife of Indonesia's second president Suharto, in recognition of her efforts in orchid development in Indonesia.

Description
Cymbidium hartinahianum is a terrestrial orchid. This flower loves direct sunshine and can be found surrounded by moss and Nepenthes.  The leaves are 50–60 cm long, ribbon-shaped with sharp ends. The flower is small and star-shaped, the top petals and sepals yellow-green, the lip reddish brown with a yellow border.

References

hartinahianum
Endemic flora of Sumatra
Plants described in 1977